Appelpop is a two-day pop festival in the Dutch town of Tiel that is held in the second weekend of September, a week in advance of the Fruitcorso event. 
The festival was introduced in 1991 in the town centre with a few hundred visitors, but it soon attracted more public and moved to a parking place adjacent to the river Waal. With some 180,000 visitors in 2008, it is the largest free festival in the Netherlands that lasts for more than a day.

During the years, many bands (mostly Dutch bands) played on this festival. Anouk, Bløf, Krezip and Within Temptation have all played multiple times at Appelpop.

External links
Appelpop

Music festivals in the Netherlands
Recurring events established in 1991
Tourist attractions in Gelderland
1991 establishments in the Netherlands
Tiel